Armenian cuisine includes the foods and cooking techniques of the Armenian people and traditional Armenian foods and dishes. The cuisine reflects the history and geography where Armenians have lived as well as sharing outside influences from European and Levantine cuisines. The cuisine also reflects the traditional crops and animals grown and raised in Armenian-populated areas.

The preparation of meat, fish, and vegetable dishes in an Armenian kitchen often requires stuffing, frothing, and puréeing. Lamb, eggplant, and bread (lavash) are basic features of Armenian cuisine. Armenians traditionally prefer cracked wheat (bulgur) to maize and rice. The flavor of the food often relies on the quality and freshness of the ingredients rather than on excessive use of spices.

Fresh herbs are used extensively, both in the food and as accompaniments. Dried herbs are used in the winter when fresh herbs are not available. Wheat is the primary grain and is found in a variety of forms, such as whole wheat, shelled wheat, bulgur (parboiled cracked wheat), semolina, farina, and flour. Historically, rice was used mostly in the cities and in certain rice-growing areas (such as Marash and the region around Yerevan). Legumes are used liberally, especially chick peas, lentils, white beans, and kidney beans. Nuts are used both for texture and to add nutrition to Lenten dishes. Of primary usage are not only walnuts, almonds, and pine nuts, but also hazelnuts, pistachios (in Cilicia), and nuts from regional trees.

Fresh and dried fruit are used both as main ingredients and as sour agents. As main ingredients, the following fruits are used: apricots (fresh and dried), quince, melons, and others. As sour agents, the following fruits are used: sumac berries (in dried, powdered form), sour grapes, plums (either sour or dried), pomegranate, apricots, cherries (especially sour cherries), and lemons. In addition to grape leaves, cabbage leaves, chard, beet leaves, radish leaves, strawberry leaves, and others are also stuffed.

Background
A typical meal in an Armenian household might consist of bread, butter, buttermilk, cheese, fresh and picked vegetables, and radishes. Lunch might include a vegetable or meatball soup with sour milk.

Lamb, yogurt, eggplant and bread are basic features of the cuisine of the Caucasus, and in this regard, Armenian cuisine is often similar, but there are some regional differences. In Soviet cookbooks the Armenian cuisine is always stated to be the oldest of Transcaucasia and one of the oldest in whole Asia. Armenian dishes make use of cracked wheat, especially in their pilavs, while Georgian variations use maize. Armenian cuisine also makes use of mixed flours made from wheat, potato and maize, which produces flavors that are difficult to replicate. Armenians call kofta kiufta and tail fat dmak. Archaeologists have found traces of barley, grapes, lentils, peas, plums, sesame, and wheat during excavations of the Erebuni Fortress in Yerevan.

Herbs are used copiously in Armenian cuisine, and Armenian desserts are often flavored with rose water, orange flower water and honey. Salads are a staple of the Armenian diet, along with various yogurt soups and lamb stews, which sometimes include apricots. Pomegranate juice is a popular beverage. Murat Belge has written that both Armenian and Iranian cuisines have meat and fruit dishes, where meat is cooked together with fruits like quince and plums, which are uncommon in Ottoman cuisine.

Mezes made with chickpeas, lentils, beans and eggplants play a role in Armenian cuisine, often served with traditional lavash bread. Lavash may also be used as a wrap for various combinations of fried meat, vegetables, cheese and herbs. Cold cucumber soup is a common dish. Bozbash is a soup of fatty lamb meat that may include various fruits and vegetables such as quince and apples. Armenian cuisine also features filled pastry pies called boereg, various types of sausages, toasted pumpkin seeds, pistachios, pine nuts, basturma, and dolma.

Cinnamon is a very commonly used spice in Armenian cuisine; it is sprinkled on soups, breads, desserts and sometimes even fish. Salads are served with a lemon-cinnamon dressing alongside as an accompaniment to meat kebabs. In a survey of Armenian-American cuisine, ginger was rated an important spice.

Sources

Armenians were affected by the ongoing Ottoman–Persian Wars (one text laments "The whole land is enslaved by the cursed Suleyman") and produced many literary works in the 16th and 17th centuries emphasizing the Christian identity of Armenians in troubled Anatolia. Food became a central theme in this body of Armenian literature. Despite prohibitions in early Armenian law codes against Armenians eating or drinking with Muslims, a "sort of blasphemous" 17th century Armenian drinking song describes a feast in Van attended by Armenian priests, laymen and Turks, with the refrain repeating "Intercede to the great barrel, bountiful is its wine."  The poem contains many Armenian terms for common foods. Some of the terms found in Andreas are: 
Halva
Porak
Paxlava
Herisa
Lahana
Yaprax k'ufta
Xorovac

Ardashes H. Keoleian authored the Oriental Cookbook (1913) is a collection of recipes from the Middle East "adapted to American tastes and methods of preparation" is a mixed collection of recipes that includes some recipes from the Armenian cuisine.

Armenian-American cookbook author Rose Baboian made her collection of traditional Armenian recipes accessible for young, English-speaking Armenians. Born in Aintab (present day Gaziantep), she survived the Armenian Genocide when her school was moved to Syria, eventually relocating to the United States. Mark Zanger, a Boston-based food reporter, wrote that Baboian's book "stands out as a model of American ethnic food because she recorded so many traditions". She is considered to have anticipated Armenian American fusion cooking with recipes like "chocolate yogurt".

Grains and legumes
Grains used in traditional Armenian cuisine included millet, wheat, barley, rye, peas and maize. Various legumes were also consumed such as lentils, chickpeas, and beans.

Grains are used for a variety of purposes: traditional lavash bread is made from wheat flour and grains are also added to soups to give them a thicker consistency. Lavash is baked in a traditional clay tonir oven. Bread is a very important staple of Armenian cuisine.

Kofta can be made with bulgur, finely chopped vegetables, herbs and often lamb. There are variations intended to be eaten cold or served hot. Sini keufteh is a dish similar to kibbeh, but layered and baked in a baking dish. The two outer layers are made with bulgur, lamb mince, onion and spices. The inner filling includes butter, onion, lamb mince, pine nuts and spices.

Harissa is a porridge made of wheat and meat cooked together for a long time, originally in the tonir but nowadays over a stove.  Ardashes Hagop Keoleian called it the "national dish" of Armenians. Traditionally, harissa was prepared on feast days in communal pots. The wheat used in harissa is typically shelled (pelted) wheat, though in Adana, harissa is made with կորկոտ (korkot; ground, par-boiled shelled wheat). Harissa can be made with lamb, beef, or chicken.

A common dish of Armenian cuisine is pilaf (եղինձ; yeghints). Pilaf is a seasoned rice, bulgur, or shelled wheat dish often served with meats such as lamb or beef. Armenian recipes may combine vermicelli or orzo with rice cooked in stock seasoned with mint, parsley and allspice. One traditional Armenian pilaf is made with the same noodle rice mixture cooked in stock with raisins, almonds and allspice. Armenian rices are discussed by Rose Baboian in her cookbook from 1964 which includes recipes for different pilafs, most rooted in her birthplace of Aintab in Turkey. Baboian recommends that the noodles be stir-fried first in chicken fat before being added to the pilaf. Another Armenian cookbook written by Vağinag Pürad recommends to render poultry fat in the oven with red pepper until the fat mixture turns a red color before using the strained fat to prepare pilaf. Pilaf made with bulgur and liver is a specialty of Zeytun (present day Süleymanlı).

Lapa is an Armenian word with several meanings, one of which is "watery boiled rice, thick rice soup, mush" and lepe which refers to various rice dishes differing by region. Antranig Azhderian describes Armenian pilaf as "dish resembling porridge".

In Agn (present day Kemaliye) a thin flatbread calling loshig was baked and dried. It would be wetted again before being eaten. Badjoug was a pastry of fat and flour stamped with designs and sent as a wedding invitation. Glodj was unleavened bread made for Lent and klrdig was a bread made of semolina.

Herbs and spices
Armenians make extensive use of various herbs in their dishes. One porridge prepared from cereals and wild herbs is called kerchik. (The same name is used by Yazidis.) Armenians usually eat kerchik with pickled cabbage, whereas Yazidis eat it with knotgrass (Polygonum aviculare). The Eastern Anatolia region, where many Armenians lived prior to the Armenian genocide, has an immensely rich plant biodiversity with over 3,000 vascular plant taxa—of these almost 800 are endemic species. The inhabitants of this region often lived in inaccessible area and were dependent on local cultivated and wild flora. Some of the most important areas of the region, in terms of plant diversity, include Harput, Lake Hazar and Munzur.

Commonly used spices include black pepper, sumac, cumin, and cinnamon. Some greens were dried and used to season cooking including mint, summer savory and basil. Red pepper pulp was dried in the sun. Sprigs of terebinth were dried and infused in a mixture of water, olive oil and brine, then toasted and ground. The ground terebinth was added as a seasoning for tabouleh and baked breads.

Dairy and cheese

Typical dairy items were present in the Armenian cuisine such as yogurt, strained yogurt, butter, cream, and cheese.

Cheese is a staple of Armenian cuisine and in the traditional cuisine it was consumed daily. The process of making Armenian lori cheese begins by boiling, similar to halloumi cheese. It is preserved in a brine solution. Armenian-American cookbook author Rose Baboian explains that Armenian cheesemaking techniques date back to an era before refrigeration was widely available so cheeses had to be preserved in brine solution. Chechil is a type of smoked Armenian cheese.

In Musa Dagh traditional cheese was made from curds called choukalig. Gij or kebdzoudz baneyr was salted and dried thyme combined with curds and preserved in a jug. Sourki cheese was a mixture of spices and curds shaped as a pyramid, dried, and stored in glass until it began to turn moldy. Khiroubaneyr was made by adding yogurt water to milk.

Yogurt (մածուն) and yogurt-derived products are of particular importance in the cuisine. Tahn (called ayran in Turkey) is a yogurt based drink made by mixing yogurt with water and salt (Baboian's recipe also includes sugar). This may have originated as a way of preserving yogurt by the addition of salt. Tan is the traditional Armenian name for strained yogurt. Strained yogurt that was boiled with water until completely solid was called yepadz madzoun (cooked yogurt) and it could be stored for use in winter soups. Butter was made by beating yogurt in a churn.

Baboian gives several different recipes that can be prepared with yogurt (madzoon) like barley yogurt soup, jajek (which she calls Easter Spinach Salad) and sauce served with koftas. She has also a yogurt spice cake with cinnamon, nutmeg and cloves served with coconut and walnut topping. Her recipe for fruitcake, also made with yogurt, includes dried fruits, nuts, baking spices and assorted candied fruits.

Baboian's recipes were published before yogurt was widely available in American shops, so her recipe collection included instructions for preparing yogurt at home from fresh milk when it was published. In the 1950s, Sarkis Colombosian, an Armenian who had fled Turkey in 1917, began selling yogurt from an Andover, Massachusetts based dairy farm, which he purchased during the Great Depression. The family made the yogurt themselves and also made tan. Armenian merchants in Watertown, Massachusetts began ordering yogurt, labneh and string cheese from Colombo Yogurt, and the product eventually made it on to supermarket shelves.

Tarhana is a mixture of yogurt and bulgur wheat. The yogurt and bulgur are combined and left on a tray until the grains absorb the yogurt. Once the liquid is absorbed, the grain is placed in the sun to dry and then rubbed into a powder. This powder can be used to thicken soups or stews. Traditionally, it was stored in cloth bags. Three types tarhana are known from Agn (present day Kemaliye): the commonly known tahneh tarhana made from milled bulgur and ayran, chreh tarhana from bulgur and water (for Lent) and shira tarhana with bulgur and grape juice. According to Stanley Kerr, a staff member at the Near East Relief orphanage for Armenian children, when the massacres began during the Battle of Marash Armenians sheltering at a soap factory sustained themselves on stores that included tarhana, dried fruits and olive oil.

Fruits and other sweets

The main ingredients in Armenian sweets are honey, fruits, nuts, yogurt and sesame. Both dried and fresh fruits are used. There are many fruit-based Armenian desserts including smoked peaches and nuts cooked in honey and various fruit compotes. Armenian syrupy walnuts (called churchkhela in Georgia) are sweetened with mulberry or grape juice. Yogurt and nuts can be sweetened with honey. Cinnamon is heavily used as spice for desserts like apricot compote and kurabiye (a type of cookie).

Armenian and Persian peaches were reportedly traded westward during the era of Alexander the Great. One Soviet-era writer reports that Armenia's apricots, peaches, walnuts and quince are "equal or superior to the world's best grades". Another writes "Armenian peaches are famous, and her brandies are popular throughout the world". Grapes, figs, and pomegranates are also popular. Grapes and apricots are commonly used to make bastegh, a dried "fruit leather" of possible Persian origins that resembles Fruit Roll-Ups.

The Armenian version of the wheat berry pudding ashure is called anoushabour. Since Armenians serve this pudding during Christmas and on New Year's Eve, it is sometimes called "Armenian Christmas Pudding". The pudding may be accompanied by kurabiye or nuts such as almonds and pistachios. Like ashure, the Christmas Pudding may be garnished with pomegranate seeds and flavored with rose water, and shared with neighbors during the Christmas season. This festive pudding is the centerpiece of the New Year's table, which is often decorated with dried fruits, nuts and pomegranates.

In The Art of Armenian Cooking, Rose Baboian describes three methods of making the pastry sheets for baklava, noting that this pastry is one of the most difficult to make from scratch. Armenians say the name of the pastry, which they call paklava, derives from the Armenian word bakh (Lent) and helvah ("sweet").

Other Armenian sweets:
 Alani ( alani) – pitted dried peaches stuffed with ground walnuts and sugar.
 Kadaif (ghataif) – shredded dough with cream, cheese, or chopped walnut filling, soaked with sugar syrup.

Meats

Armenians eat various meats like mutton, beef and goat but the most popular meat in Armenian cuisine is pork. Sixteenth- and seventeenth-century Armenian writers in Ottoman Anatolia considered eating pork an important marker of Christian identity. An Armenian priest writing in the sixteenth century concluded, "If we didn't eat the meat of the pig, then we wouldn't be Christian." 

Roasted piglet, called gochi, is a traditional holiday meal prepared for New Year's celebrations. Roasted pork chops (chalagach) are a favored item for barbeques. Horovats is an Armenian-style kebab that is usually made from pork, but can also be made with lamb. This kebab is prepared with vegetables like eggplant, tomato and green pepper. Lula kebab is very similar to adana kebab, but spiced with cinnamon.

Keshkegh is a bulgur pilav-based dish with lamb or chicken; it is cooked in a broth and flavored with butter, cinnamon and pepper.

Tavuklu çullama is a chicken dish that is sometimes identified as Armenian, but there are conflicting accounts about its region of origin and preparation of the dish varies substantially between regions. Some say it is a specialty of the Kırşehir region, while another variation served in simple syrup is prepared annually in Maraş, Turkey.

Basturma is a salted meat that is dried and pressed before being rubbed with a special spice paste called çemen; it is a common food item in Armenia.
 
 Yershig ( suǰux) – a spicy beef sausage
 Kiufta ( kololak) – meaning meatball comes in many types, such as Hayastan kiufta, Kharpert kiufta (Porov kiufta), Ishli kiufta, etc.
 Tehal (also known as ghavurma) is potted meat preserved in its own fat.

Doughs

 Matnakash ( matnak’aš) – soft and puffy leavened bread, made of wheat flour and shaped into oval or round loaves; the characteristic golden or golden-brown crust is achieved by coating the surface of the loaves with sweetened tea essence before baking.
 Bagharch – ritual bread prepared for New Year's Eve, Mid-Lent, etc.
 Choereg (or choreg) – braided bread formed into rolls or loaves, also a traditional loaf for Easter.
 Zhingyalov hats - Zhingyalov hats, not an everyday bread, are made with dough, dried cranberry and pomegranate molasses that go inside the dough, and seven different greens which include spinach, coriander, parsley, basil, scallions, dill, and mint. There is a variety of combinations that can be used in the bread and these greens can easily be substituted for other greens. The greens are placed in the bread and the bread is folded like a calzone.

Typical dishes

The "everyday" Armenian dish is the dzhash (Ճաշ). This is a brothy stew consisting of meat (or a legume, in the meatless version), a vegetable, and spices. The dzhash was typically cooked in the tonir. The dzhash is generally served over a pilaf of rice or bulgur, sometimes accompanied by bread, pickles or fresh vegetables or herbs. A specific variety of dzhash is the porani (պորանի), a stew made with yogurt. Examples of dzhash are:
 Meat and green beans or green peas (with tomato sauce, garlic, and mint or fresh dill)
 Meat and summer squash (or zucchini). This is a signature dish from Ainteb, and is characterized by the liberal use of dried mint, tomatoes, and lemon juice.
 Meat and pumpkin. This is a wedding dish from Marash made with meat, chick peas, pumpkin, tomato and pepper paste, and spices.
 Meat and leeks in a yoghurt sauce.
 Urfa-style porani, made with small meatballs, chickpeas, chard, and desert truffles.

Grilled meats are quite common as well and are omnipresent at market stalls, where they are eaten as fast food, as well as at barbecues and picnic. Also, in modern times, no Armenian banquet is considered complete without an entree of kabob. Kabobs vary from the simple (marinated meat on a skewer interspersed with vegetables) to the more elaborate. Certain regions in Western Armenia developed their local, specialized kabobs. For example:

 Urfa kebab, spiced ground meat interspersed with eggplant slices.
 Orukh and khanum budu, two Cilician specialties in which lean ground meat is kneaded with dough and spices and lined on a skewer.

Breakfast
The modern Armenian breakfast consists of coffee or tea, plus a spread of cheeses, jams, jellies, vegetables, eggs, and breads. Armenians living in the Diaspora often adopt local customs. Thus, Armenians in Lebanon, Syria, and Egypt may include "ful" (stewed fava beans in olive oil).

Traditional Armenian breakfast dishes were hearty. They included:

 Khash, sometimes colloquially called the "Armenian hangover cure", is a basic dish of simmered cow's hooves. Khash is mentioned in 12th century medieval Armenian texts.
 Kalagyosh: There are many variants of this dish. It can be a meat and yogurt stew or it can be a vegetarian stew made with lentils, fried onions, and matzoon. In either case, it was traditionally eaten by crumbling stale lavash bread over it and eating it with a spoon.
 Loligov dzvadzekh (tomato and egg scramble): This is a very common breakfast item, essentially a simple scramble with tomato as the base. Some iterations of this dish can include, most commonly, onions and bell peppers. This is usually served with traditional lavash bread, ani panir (Armenian feta) and herbs (tarragon, purple basil, and cilantro).

Appetizers
Meals in Armenia often start with a spread of appetizers served for "the table".

Armenian appetizers include stuffed vine leaves (called yalanchy sarma, a type of dolma), a fried cheese-stuffed pastry called dabgadz banir boerag, stuffed mussels (midye dolma) and several types of pickled vegetables generally known as torshi. Toasted pumpkin seeds are a popular snack; Armenians call them tutumi gud.

Chickpea balls called topik are made by Turkey's Armenian community; they are spiced with currants, onions, and cinnamon and served with a tahini sauce.

Takuhi Tovmasyan discusses several Armenian mezzes in her book Sofranız Şen Olsun including stuffed mackerel, a dish of beans in sauce served over stale bread (leftover yufka bread or lavash may be used also) called fasulye paçası, and a type of olive-oil based appetizer with mussels called midye pilakisi.

Salads
Many, if not most, Armenian salads combine a grain or legume with fresh vegetables—often tomato, onions, and fresh herbs. Mayonnaise is used in Western or Russian-inspired salads (e.g., Salade Olivier). Examples of Armenian salads include:
 Eetch – cracked wheat salad, similar to the Middle Eastern tabouleh.
 Lentil salad – brown lentils, tomatoes, onions, in a dressing of lemon juice, olive oil, and chopped parsley. This salad has many variations, with the lentils being replaced by chick peas, black-eyed peas, chopped raw or roasted eggplant, etc.

Byorek

 Byoreks, are pies made with phyllo pastry and stuffed with cheese (panirov byorek, from Armenian: panir for cheese, Eastern Armenians refer to this as Khachapuri) or spinach (similar to spanakopita in Greek cuisine). They are a popular snack and fast food, often served as appetizer. Su byorek lit. 'water burek' is a lasagna-style dish with sheets of phyllo pastry briefly boiled in a large pan before being spread with fillings. Msov byorek is a bread roll (not phyllo pastry) stuffed with ground meat (similar to Russian pirozhki).
 Semsek, from the region of Urfa, is a fried open-faced meat byorek.
 A specific Lenten byorek is made with spinach and tahini sauce.

Soups

Armenian soups include spas, made from matzoon, hulled wheat and herbs (usually cilantro), and aveluk, made from lentils, walnuts, and wild mountain sorrel (which gives the soup its name). Kiufta soup is made with large balls of strained boiled meat (kiufta) and greens.

Another soup, khash, is considered an Armenian institution. Songs and poems have been written about this one dish, which is made from cow's feet and herbs made into a clear broth. Tradition holds that khash can only be cooked by men, who spend the entire night cooking, and can be eaten only in the early morning in the dead of winter, when it is served with heaps of fresh garlic and dried lavash.

T'ghit is made from t'tu lavash (fruit leather, thin rolled-up sheets of sour plum purée), which are cut into small pieces and boiled in water. Fried onions are added and the mixture is cooked into a purée. Pieces of lavash bread are placed on top of the mixture, and it is eaten hot with fresh lavash used to scoop up the mixture by hand.

Karshm is a local soup made in the town of Vaik in the Vayots Dzor Province. This is a walnut-based soup with red and green beans, chick peas and spices, served garnished with red pepper and fresh garlic.
Soups of Russian heritage include borscht, a beet root soup with meat and vegetables (served hot in Armenia, with fresh sour cream) and okroshka, a matzoon- or kefir-based soup with chopped cucumber, green onion, and garlic.

 Arganak ( arganak) – chicken soup with small meatballs, garnished before serving with beaten egg yolks, lemon juice, and parsley.
 Blghourapour ( blġurapur) – a sweet soup made of hulled wheat cooked in grape juice; served hot or cold.
 Bozbash ( bozbaš) – a mutton or lamb soup that exists in several regional varieties with the addition of different vegetables and fruits.
 Brndzapour ( brndzapur) – rice and potato soup, garnished with coriander.
 Dzavarapour ( dzavarapur) – hulled wheat, potatoes, tomato purée; egg yolks diluted with water are stirred into the soup before serving.
 Flol – beef soup with coarsely chopped spinach leaves and cherry-sized dumplings made from oatmeal or wheat flour.
 Harissa ( harisa, also known as ճիտապուր) – porridge of coarsely ground wheat with pieces of boned chicken
 Katnapour ( kat’napur) – a milk-based rice soup, sweetened with sugar.
 Katnov ( kat’nov) – a milk-based rice soup with cinnamon and sugar.
 Kololak ( kololak) – soup cooked from mutton bones with ground mutton dumplings, rice, and fresh tarragon garnish; a beaten egg is stirred into the soup before serving.
 Krchik ( kṙčik)  – soup made from sauerkraut, pickled cabbage, hulled wheat, potatoes, and tomato purée.
 Mantapour ( mantʿapur) – beef soup with manti; the manti are typically served with matzoon or sour cream (ttvaser), accompanied by clear soup.
 Matsnaprtosh ( matsnaprt'oš) - this is the same as okroshka, referenced earlier, with sour clotted milk diluted with cold water, with less vegetation than okroshka itself. Matsnaprtosh is served cold as a refreshment and supposedly normalizes blood pressure.
 Putuk ( putuk) – mutton cut into pieces, dried peas, potatoes, leeks, and tomato purée, cooked and served in individual crocks.
 Sarnapour ( saṙnapur) – pea soup with rice, beets and matzoon.
 Snkapur ( snkapur) – a mushroom soup.
 Tarkhana ( t’arxana) – flour and matzoon soup
 Vospapour ( ospapur) – lentil soup with dried fruits and ground walnuts.
 Pekhapour (mustache soup) – chick peas, shelled wheat (ծեծած), lentils, in a vegetarian broth and fresh tarragon. This soup originates from Aintab.

Fish

Armenian cuisine includes many typical seafood dishes like fried mussels (midye tava), stuffed calamari (kalamar dolma), mackerel (uskumru) and bonito (palamut).

The trout from Lake Sevan is called ishkhan and can be prepared different ways including a baked dolma version stuffed with dried fruits (prunes, damsons, or apricots) and a poached version marinated with red peppers. Ishkhan is also sometimes served in a walnut sauce. One recipe for fish tirit is given by a 1913 cookbook that adapted Near Eastern recipes for the American palatte.

For a relatively land-locked country, Armenian cuisine includes a surprising number of fish dishes. Typically, fish is either broiled, fried, or sometimes poached. A few recipes direct the fish to be stuffed. Fish may have been used to stuff vegetables in ancient times, though that is not common anymore.

There are several varieties of fish in Armenia:
Sig ( sig) – a whitefish from Lake Sevan, native to northern Russian lakes (endangered species in Armenia).
Karmrakhayt (alabalagh) ( karmrakhayt) – a river trout, also produced in high-altitude artificial lakes (e.g., the Mantash Reservoir in Shirak Province).
Koghak ( koġak) – an indigenous Lake Sevan fish of the carp family, also called Sevan khramulya (overfished)

Main courses

 Fasulya (fassoulia) – a stew made with green beans, lamb and tomato broth or other ingredients
 Ghapama ( ġap’ama) – pumpkin stew
 Kchuch ( kč̣uč̣) – a casserole of mixed vegetables with pieces of meat or fish on top, baked and served in a clay pot
 Tjvjik ( tžvžik) – a dish of fried liver and kidneys with onions

Ritual foods

Baki Koufta are peanut butter and tahini stuffed kofta made with a shell of chickpeas, bulgur and semolina. They are commonly made for Lent which is observed in the Armenian Orthodox Church.

 Nshkhar ( nšxar) – bread used for Holy Communion
 Mas ( mas) – literally means "piece" a piece of leftover bread from the making of Nshkhar, given to worshippers after church service
 Matagh ( mataġ) – sacrificial meat. can be of any animal such as goat, lamb, or even bird.

Drinks

Armenian coffee – strong black coffee, finely ground, sometimes sweet
Kefir – fermented milk drink
Tahn – yogurt drink (still or carbonated)
ARARAT, THE WELL, WELL GO, BABY WELL – a brands of mineral waters from Ararat Region, Vedi, Artashat.
Jermuk ( J̌ermuk) – a brand of mineral water from the Jermuk area.
Hayq, Sari – a brand of bottled mountain spring water from the Jermuk area (in Armenian Hayq stands for Armenia and Sari for from the mountains).
Tarkhun soda ( t’arxun) – tarragon-flavored soda.

Alcoholic drinks

Beer 

Beer ( gareǰur)

Armenian produced beer is considered to be one of the favorite drinks of Armenian men. The beer industry is developing barley malt and producing beer from it. The preparation of beer in Armenia was known from ancient times. According to the Greek historian Xenophon the manufacture of beer in Armenia has begun from BC 5th-4th centuries. Armenians used beer grains for brewing (barley, millet, hops).

In 1913 there were 3 beer factories that produced 54 thousand deciliters of beer. In 1952-78 new factories in Yerevan, Goris, Alaverdi, Abovyan were built while existing factories were expanded and improved upon. For providing raw materials for beer production in Gyumri was launched large malt plant, based in the production of barley melt of Shirak valley farms (with the capacity of 10 thousand tons of production). In 1985 was produced 6 million deciliters of beer.

Popular Brands
Kotayk
Kilikia 
Erebuni (produced by Kotayk Brewery)
Gyumri
Aleksandrapol 
Dargett

Brandy 
Armenian brandy ( konyak), known locally as konyak is perhaps Armenia's most popular exported alcoholic drink. It has a long history of production. Armenian brandy made by Yerevan Wine & Brandy Factory was said to be the favorite drink of British statesman Winston Churchill. It was the favorite alcoholic drink of Joseph Stalin, Franklin D. Roosevelt and Churchill at the Yalta conference at 1945.

The history of Armenian brandy begins in 1887, in the winery of Armenian merchant N. Tairov (Yerevan). By 1890-1900 Yerevan was becoming a center for the production of brandy, numbering a number of factories owned by Gyozalov (1892), Saradjev (1894), Ter-Mkrtchian (1899), and others. In 1899, N. Tairov sold his factory to Nikolay Shustov's well-known brand in Russia. In 1914, there were 15 factories in the province of Yerevan (the largest the one now owned by Shustov) produced 210,010 deciliters of brandy. In 1921, the Soviet state took over Shustov's factory, and it was renamed to "Ararat". This became the main factory for wine manufacturing.

Despite the fact that only brandies produced in the Cognac region of France have the copyright to be called "cognac" according to Western trade rules, Armenian brandy is called cognac inside Armenia. Yerevan Brandy Factory is now negotiating to obtain an official privilege to market its brandy as cognac.

Armenian brandy is categorized by its age and method of aging. The rated stars indicate the age of brandy since its fermentation starting from 3 stars. The most expensive cognacs have passed additional vintage for more than 6 years and have special names. The brandy is aged in oak barrels and is made from selected local white grapes grown in the Ararat Valley which is giving it a shade of caramel brown.

Popular Brands
Ararat
Noy

Oghi 

Oghi ( òġi) – an Armenian alcoholic beverage usually distilled from fruit; also called aragh. Artsakh is a well-known brand name of Armenian mulberry vodka (tuti oghi) produced in Nagorno-Karabakh from local fruit. In the Armenian Diaspora, where fruit vodka is not distilled, oghi refers to the aniseed-flavored distilled alcoholic drink called arak in the Middle East, raki in Turkey, or ouzo in Greece.
 Mulberry vodka (  t’t’i araġ) A traditional Armenian vodka made from distilling the mulberry, which is grown all over Armenia, especially in the highlands and Artsakh.

Wine 
The alcoholic drink with the longest history in Armenia is wine. The oldest known winery in the world was discovered in Armenia. Historically, wineries in Armenia were concentrated along the Ararat valley. Of particular note was the district of Koghtn (Գողթն, current Nakhichevan area). Today, Armenian wineries are concentrated in the Areni region (district of Vayots Dzor).

Armenian wine is mostly made from local varietals, such as Areni, Lalvari, Kakhet, etc., though some wineries mix in better known European varietals such as Chardonnay and Cabernet. Winemaking took a downward plunge in the years following the collapse of the Soviet Union, but is undergoing a revival, with the addition of world-class labels such as Zorah Wines. A yearly wine festival, held in Areni, is popular with the locals and features wines from official wineries as well as homemade hooch of varying quality. Armenian wines are predominantly red and are sweet, semi-sweet (Vernashen, Ijevan), or dry (Areni).

Armenian Highland engaged in winemaking since ancient times. It has achieved considerable development of Urartu times (9th - 6th centuries. BC). During excavations in the castle of Teyshebaini have been found around 480, and in Toprakkale, Manazkert, Red Hill and Ererbunium 200 pot.

The evidences of high-level and large-scale wine production in Armenia are as foreign (Herodotus, Strabo, Xenophon and others) and Armenian historians of the 5th-18th centuries, as well as sculptures of architectural monuments and protocols. Armenia's current area began wine production in the 2nd half of the 19th century. At the end of the 19th century, next to the small businesses in Yerevan, Ghamarlu (Artashat), Ashtarak, Echmiadzin (Vagharshapat ), there were 4 mill.

In addition to grapes, wines have been made with other fruit, notably pomegranate ( nran kini), apricot, quince, etc. In some cases, these fruit wines are fortified.

Mineral waters 
Among the soft drinks Armenian mineral water is known for its healing specialty and is recommended by doctors. This spring water originates from the depth of earth and flowing from ancient mountains in the city of Jermuk.

Armenia has rich reserves of mineral water. After the establishment of the Soviet Union the study and development of multilateral disciplines in these waters began. First industrial bottling was organized in Arzni in 1927. In 1949, Dilijan and Jermuk mineral water factories were put into operation. In 1960-1980 “Sevan”, “Hankavan”, “Lichk”, “Bjni”, “Lori”, “Arpi”, “Ararat”, mineral water bottling plants and factories were launched, which are involved in the production unit "mineral water of Armenia". ASSR in 1985 produced 295 million bottles of mineral water.

References

Bibliography

External links

 
Caucasian cuisine